Moles are small mammals adapted to a subterranean lifestyle. They have cylindrical bodies, velvety fur, very small, inconspicuous eyes and ears, reduced hindlimbs, and short, powerful forelimbs with large paws adapted for digging.

The word “mole” refers to any species in the family Talpidae, which means “mole” in Latin. Moles are found in most parts of North America, Europe and Asia. 

Moles may be viewed as pests to gardeners, but they provide positive contributions to soil, gardens, and ecosystems, including soil aeration, feeding on slugs and small creatures that eat plant roots, and providing prey for other wildlife. They eat earthworms and other small invertebrates in the soil.

Terminology
In Middle English, moles were known as moldwarp. The expression "don't make a mountain out of a molehill" (which means "exaggerating problems") was first recorded in Tudor times. By the era of Early Modern English, the mole was also known in English as mouldywarp, a word having cognates in other Germanic languages such as German (Maulwurf), and Danish, Norwegian, Swedish and Icelandic (muldvarp, moldvarp, mullvad, moldvarpa), where muld/mull/mold refers to soil and varp/vad/varpa refers to throwing, hence "one who throws soil" or "dirt-tosser".

Male moles are called "boars", females are called "sows".

Characteristics

Underground breathing
Moles have been found to tolerate higher levels of carbon dioxide than other mammals, because their blood cells have a special form of hemoglobin that has a higher affinity to oxygen than other forms. In addition, moles use oxygen more effectively by reusing the exhaled air, and can survive in low-oxygen environments such as burrows.

Extra thumbs

Moles have polydactyl forepaws: each has an extra thumb (also known as a prepollex) next to the regular thumb. While the mole's other digits have multiple joints, the prepollex has a single, sickle-shaped bone that develops later and differently from the other fingers during embryogenesis from a transformed sesamoid bone in the wrist, independently evolved but similar to the giant panda thumb. This supernumerary digit is species-specific, as it is not present in shrews, the mole's closest relatives. Androgenic steroids are known to affect the growth and formation of bones, and a connection is possible between this species-specific trait and the "male" genital apparatus in female moles of many mole species (gonads with testicular and ovary tissues).

Diet 
Moles are omnivores, but their diet does primarily consist of earthworms and other small invertebrates found in the soil. The mole runs are in reality "worm traps", the mole sensing when a worm falls into the tunnel and quickly running along to kill and eat it. Because their saliva contains a toxin that can paralyze earthworms, moles are able to store their still-living prey for later consumption. They construct special underground "larders" for just this purpose; researchers have discovered such larders with over a thousand earthworms in them. Before eating earthworms, moles pull them between their squeezed paws to force the collected earth and dirt out of the worm's gut.

The star-nosed mole can detect, catch and eat food faster than the human eye can follow.

Breeding
Breeding season for a mole depends on species, but is generally from February through to May. Males search for females by letting out high-pitched squeals and tunneling through foreign areas.

The gestation period of the Eastern (North America) mole (Scalopus aquaticus) is approximately 42 days. Three to five young are born, mainly in March and early April.

Townsend moles mate in February and March, and the 2–4 young are born in March and April after a gestation period of about 1 month. The Townsend mole is endangered in the United States and Canada.

Coast moles produce a litter of 2–5 pups between March and April.

Pups leave the nest 33 days after birth to find territories of their own. They disperse from their mother’s range around 5–6 weeks and they become sexually mature during the spring following their birth.

Social structure
Allegedly moles are solitary creatures, coming together only to mate. Territories may overlap, but moles avoid each other and males may fight fiercely if they meet.

Classification

The family Talpidae contains all the true moles and some of their close relatives. Those species called "shrew moles" represent an intermediate form between the moles and their shrew ancestors, and as such may not be fully described by the article.

On the other hand, there is no monophyletic relation between the mole and the hedgehog, both of which were previously placed in the now-abandoned order Insectivora. As a result, Eulipotyphla (shrew-like animals, including moles), previously within Insectivora, has been elevated to the level of an order.

 Subfamily Scalopinae: New World moles
 Tribe Condylurini: Star-nosed mole (North America)
 Genus Condylura: Star-nosed mole (the sole species)
 Tribe Scalopini: New World moles
 Genus Alpiscaptulus: Medog mole (China)
Genus Parascalops: Hairy-tailed mole (northeastern North America)
 Genus Scalopus: Eastern mole (North America)
 Genus Scapanulus: Gansu mole (China)
 Genus Scapanus: Western North American moles (five species)
 Subfamily Talpinae: Old World moles, desmans, and shrew moles
Tribe Desmanini
Genus Desmana: Russian desman
Genus Galemys: Pyrenean desman
Tribe Talpini: Old World moles
 Genus Euroscaptor: Ten Asian species
 Genus Mogera: Nine species from Japan, Korea, and eastern China
 Genus Parascaptor: White-tailed mole, southern Asia
 Genus Scaptochirus: Short-faced mole, China
 Genus Talpa: Thirteen species, Europe and western Asia
 Tribe Scaptonychini: Long-tailed mole
 Genus Scaptonyx: Long-tailed mole (China and Myanmar (Burma))
 Tribe Urotrichini: Japanese shrew moles
 Genus Dymecodon: True’s shrew mole
 Genus Urotrichus: Japanese shrew mole
 Tribe Neurotrichini: New World shrew moles
 Genus Neurotrichus: American shrew mole (US Pacific Northwest, southwest British Columbia)
 Subfamily Uropsilinae: Asian shrew moles
 Genus Uropsilus: Five species in China, Bhutan, and Myanmar (Burma)

Other "moles"
While many groups of burrowing animals (pink fairy armadillos, tuco-tucos, mole rats, mole crickets, and mole crabs) have developed close physical similarities with moles due to convergent evolution, two of these are so similar to true moles, they are commonly called and thought of as "moles" in common English, although they are completely unrelated to true moles or to each other. These are the golden moles of southern Africa and the marsupial moles of Australia. While difficult to distinguish from each other, they are most easily distinguished from true moles by shovel-like patches on their noses, which they use in tandem with their abbreviated forepaws to swim through sandy soils.

Golden moles
The golden moles belong to the same branch on the phylogenetic tree as the tenrecs, called Tenrecomorpha, which, in turn, stem from a main branch of placental mammals called the Afrosoricida. This means that they share a closer common ancestor with such existing afrosoricids as elephants, manatees and aardvarks than they do with other placental mammals, such as true Talpidae moles.

 ORDER AFROSORICIDA
 Suborder Tenrecomorpha
 Family Tenrecidae: tenrecs, 34 species in 10 genera
 Suborder Chrysochloridea
 Family Chrysochloridae
 Subfamily Chrysochlorinae
 Genus Carpitalpa
 Arends' golden mole (Carpitalpa arendsi)
 Genus Chlorotalpa
 Duthie's golden mole (Chlorotalpa duthieae)
 Sclater's golden mole (Chlorotalpa sclateri)
 Genus Chrysochloris
 Subgenus Chrysochloris
 Cape golden mole (Chrysochloris asiatica)
 Visagie's golden mole (Chrysochloris visagiei)
 Subgenus Kilimatalpa
 Stuhlmann's golden mole (Chrysochloris stuhlmanni)
 Genus Chrysospalax
 Giant golden mole (Chrysospalax trevelyani)
 Rough-haired golden mole (Chrysospalax villosus)
 Genus Cryptochloris
 De Winton's golden mole (Cryptochloris wintoni)
 Van Zyl's golden mole (Cryptochloris zyli)
 Genus Eremitalpa
 Grant's golden mole (Eremitalpa granti)
 Subfamily Amblysominae
 Genus Amblysomus
 Fynbos golden mole (Amblysomus corriae)
 Hottentot golden mole (Amblysomus hottentotus)
 Marley's golden mole (Amblysomus marleyi)
 Robust golden mole (Amblysomus robustus)
 Highveld golden mole (Amblysomus septentrionalis)
 Genus Calcochloris
 Subgenus Huetia
 Congo golden mole (Calcochloris leucorhinus)
 Subgenus Calcochloris
 Yellow golden mole (Calcochloris obtusirostris)
 Subgenus incertae sedis
 Somali golden mole (Calcochloris tytonis)
 Genus Neamblysomus
 Juliana's golden mole (Neamblysomus julianae)
 Gunning's golden mole (Neamblysomus gunningi)

Marsupial moles

As marsupials, these moles are even more distantly related to true talpid moles than golden moles are, both of which belong to the Eutheria, or placental mammals. This means that they are more closely related to such existing Australian marsupials as kangaroos or koalas, and even to a lesser extent to American marsupials, such as opossums, than they are to placental mammals, such as golden or Talpidae moles.

Class Mammalia
Subclass Prototheria: monotremes (echidnas and the platypus)
Subclass Theriiformes: live-bearing mammals and their prehistoric relatives
Infraclass Holotheria: modern live-bearing mammals and their prehistoric relatives
Supercohort Theria: live-bearing mammals
Cohort Marsupialia: marsupials
Magnorder Ameridelphia: New World marsupials
 Order Didelphimorphia (opossums)
 Order Paucituberculata (shrew opossums)
Superorder Australidelphia Australian marsupials
 Order Dasyuromorphia (the Tasmanian devil, the numbat, thylacines, quolls, dunnarts and others)
 Order Peramelemorphia (bilbies, bandicoots and rainforest bandicoots)
 Order Diprotodontia (koalas, wombats, diprotodonts, possums, cuscuses, sugar gliders, kangaroos and others)
 Order Notoryctemorphia (marsupial moles and closely related extinct families of marsupials)
 Family Notoryctidae (living and extinct marsupial mole genera)
 Genus Notoryctes (only genus of marsupial moles with living species)
 Species Notoryctes typhlops (southern marsupial mole)
 Species Notoryctes caurinus (northern marsupial mole)

Interaction with humans

Pelts

Moles' pelts have a velvety texture not found in surface animals. Surface-dwelling animals tend to have longer fur with a natural tendency for the nap to lie in a particular direction, but to facilitate their burrowing lifestyle, mole pelts are short and very dense and have no particular direction to the nap. This makes it easy for moles to move backwards underground, as their fur is not "brushed the wrong way". The leather is extremely soft and supple. Queen Alexandra, the wife of Edward VII of the United Kingdom, ordered a mole-fur garment to start a fashion that would create a demand for mole fur, thereby turning what had been a serious pest problem in Scotland into a lucrative industry for the country. Hundreds of pelts are cut into rectangles and sewn together to make a coat. The natural color is taupe, (derived from the French noun taupe meaning mole) but it is readily dyed any color.

Pest status - extermination and humane options

Moles are considered agricultural pests in some countries, while in others, such as Germany, they are a protected species, but may be killed with a permit. Problems cited as caused by moles include contamination of silage with soil particles, making it unpalatable to livestock, the covering of pasture with fresh soil reducing its size and yield, damage to agricultural machinery by the exposure of stones, damage to young plants through disturbance of the soil, weed invasion of pasture through exposure of freshly tilled soil, and damage to drainage systems and watercourses. Other species such as weasels and voles may use mole tunnels to gain access to enclosed areas or plant roots.

Moles burrow and raise molehills, killing parts of lawns. They can undermine plant roots, indirectly causing damage or death. Moles do not eat plant roots.

Moles are controlled with traps such as mole-catchers, smoke bombs, and poisons such as calcium carbide, which produces acetylene gas to drive moles away. Strychnine was also used for this purpose in the past. The most common method now is Phostoxin or Talunex tablets. They contain aluminium phosphide and are inserted in the mole tunnels, where they turn into phosphine gas (not be confused with phosgene gas). More recently, high-grade nitrogen gas has proven effective at killing moles, with the added advantage of having no polluting effect to the environment.

Other common defensive measures include cat litter and blood meal, to repel the mole, or smoking its burrow. Devices are also sold to trap the mole in its burrow, when one sees the "mole hill" moving and therefore knows where the animal is, and then stabbing it.

Other humane options are also possible including humane traps that capture the mole alive so it may be transported elsewhere. In many contexts including ordinary gardens, the damage caused by moles to lawns is mostly visual, and it is possible instead of extermination to simply remove the earth of the molehills as they appear, leaving their permanent galleries for the moles to continue their existence underground. However, when the tunnels are near the surface in soft ground or after heavy rain, they may collapse, leaving (small) unsightly furrows in the lawn.

Meat
William Buckland, known for eating every animal he could, opined that mole meat tasted vile.

The mole in prophetic literature
According to the first prophecy of the 'Six Kings to follow King John', written about 1312,  the six kings could be likened to animals. The sixth king after John would be the Mouldwarp or Mole, who would be proud, contemptible and cowardly, having a skin like a goat. The prophecy gained popularity during the 14th century and was used by the enemies of Henry IV alluded to by Shakespeare in Henry IV, Part 1. It was again used during the disturbances leading to the Pilgrimage of Grace 1535-7 but this time was applied by the rebels to Henry VIII.

Archaeology 
Moles can inadvertently help archaeologists by bringing small artifacts to the surface through their digging. By examining molehills for sherds and other small objects, archaeologists can find evidence of human habitation.

See also
Molehill
Moleskin
Molecatcher

References

External links

 UK Government DEFRA paper on control the European mole
 British Traditional Molecatchers Register

Agricultural pests
Body plans
Mammal common names
 

de:Maulwürfe
eo:Talpo